is a Volcanic plateau located near Tateyama in Toyama Prefecture, central Honshu, in Japan.

Murodo is a one of main highlights of Tateyama Kurobe Alpine Route. It is an important base for climbers, which is nearby Mount Tate, Mount Tsurugi, and others. There are snow walls (Yuki-no-Otani).

Geography 
Murodo was formed a lot of maar.

Mikuriga-ike pond and Midoriga-ike pond are near Murodo station, which are volcanic ponds.

Snow wall 
A 500 m-long snow wall is formed each spring on either side of the highway after snow is cleared for the opening of the Alpine Route. The awe-inspiring snow wall can reach a height of up to 20m (comparable to a seven-story building), one side of the road is designated for pedestrians, allowing you to walk between the walls of snow and enjoy the towering structures to your heart’s content. The walls are still 10m in height even in late June at the end of the season.

Gallery

See also 
Murodō Station
Mount Tate
Chūbu-Sangaku National Park
Tateyama Kurobe Alpine Route

References 

Wetlands of Japan
Ramsar sites in Japan
Landforms of Toyama Prefecture
Tateyama, Toyama
Chūbu-Sangaku National Park
Tateyama Kurobe Alpine Route